TFX (formerly NT1) is a French free television network owned by Groupe TF1.

History 
TFX, under the name NT1, was created in 2004 by AB Groupe for the launch of the TNT platform scheduled for March 2005. In late 2004, AB Group announced their intention to call the channel La Quatre (The Four). However, in January 2005, France Télévisions announced that they would rebrand their channel Festival as France 4. AB Groupe decided to revert to the NT1 name.

In June 2009, TF1 Group agreed to buy the channel from AB Groupe, as well as AB's 40% stake in TMC Monte Carlo (which would take TF1's total stake to 80%). The deal was cleared by France's competition authority and subsequently by the Council of State in December 2010, dismissing an appeal by Métropole Télévision.

TF1 Group decided to make a number of changes, notably by upgrading NT1 to 16:9 in November 2010. It was the last DVB-T channel to switch to this format. In addition, NT1 became the group's channel for young adults.

On 19 May 2015, the channel launched its version in HDTV.

On 26 May 2015, TF1, TMC, NT1 and HD1 merged their websites and created the unique website MYTF1.

On 18 October 2017, TF1 Group announced that NT1 will change its name to TFX in 2018. The rebrand took effect at 9pm on January 30, 2018.

On 28 February 2022, as part of the merger of their two groups, TF1 Group and M6 Group announce that they are in exclusive negotiations with Altice Média for the sale of TFX and 6ter.

Since October 2022, TFX, as well as the free DTT channels of the TF1 group, have been accessible free to air, via the Astra 1 satellite. This broadcast follows a temporary interruption in encrypted broadcasting to Canal+ and TNTSAT subscribers. , following a commercial dispute. However, despite the resumption of encrypted broadcasts within the Canal+ and TNTSAT bouquets, this free-to-air broadcasting continues. TFX is therefore received free of charge in almost all of Continental Europe.

Logo history

Programming

Series 
 2 Broke Girls (rerun, first aired on OCS Happy / OCS Max)
 Are We There Yet?
 Au nom de la vérité (rerun, first aired on TF1 / TF1 Séries Films)
 Charlie's Angels (2011 – rerun, first aired on Canal+ Family)
 Chuck (seasons 2–5 – season 1 in rerun, first aired on TF1)
 Dallas (2012 – seasons 2–3)
 Dragon Ball Z (Uncut Version)
 Falling Skies (rerun, first aired on OCS Max)
 Friends
 Grimm (rerun, first aired on Syfy)
 Gossip Girl (season 3)
 Haven (rerun, first aired on Syfy)
 House of Anubis (rerun, first aired on Nickelodeon)
 How I Met Your Mother (seasons 3–9 – seasons 1–2 in rerun, first aired on Canal+)
 Nikita (rerun, first aired on TF1 – season 1)
 One Tree Hill (seasons 8–9 – seasons 1–7 in rerun, first aired on TF1)
 The Originals (season 1)
 Riverdale (rerun, first aired on Netflix)
 The Secret Circle
 Terminator: The Sarah Connor Chronicles (season 2)
 The Tomorrow People
 True Blood (rerun, first aired on OCS Max / OCS City)
 The Vampire Diaries (seasons 3–5 and 8 – rerun for seasons 1–2, first aired on Canal+ Family, seasons 6–7, first aired on Série Club)
 VDM
 Violetta (rerun, first aired on Disney Channel)
 The Walking Dead (rerun, first aired on OCS Choc)

Reality TV 
 Les Vraies Housewives
 Secret Story (seasons 9-11)
 La Villa des cœurs brisés
 On a échangé nos mamans
 Super Nanny
 10 couples parfaits
 Hell's Kitchen
 Bachelor
 Pascal, le grand frère

Entertainment 
 En mode gossip
 Ma vie à la télé
 Tous différents

Sports programming 
On 24 July 2008, the channel announced it would broadcast the 2008–09 A1 Grand Prix events on Sundays. This international racing series will be shown live or pre-recorded. The deal was confirmed by Richard Maroko, General Programmes Manager of the AB Group and Richard Dorfman, A1GP's director of broadcasting.

Association football 

 FIFA World Cup qualification until 2022 (selected UEFA team (exclude France team) matches (shared with TMC, W9, and L'Équipe), France matches live on TF1 (including finals tournament) and M6)
 UEFA until 2022 (except for Nations League until 2021)
UEFA European Championship (selected qualifiers not involving France team only (shared with TMC, W9, and L'Équipe), selected qualifiers and finals (including France team matches) live on TF1 and M6)
 UEFA Nations League (selected matches (including Finals and excluding France team) (shared with L'Équipe (group stage only), TMC, and W9), France matches live on TF1 and M6)
 Friendly matches (selected matches not involving France team (shared with W9 and L'Équipe), France matches live on TF1, TMC (one match only in 2019), and M6)

Motorsport 

Moto GP (2008–2015)

Wrestling 

WWE (2006–2014)
Raw
Smackdown

References

External links
 Official Site 

Mediawan Thematics
Television stations in France
Television channels and stations established in 2005
French-language television stations